MyAnna Buring (born 22 September 1979 as Anna Margaretha My Rantapää) is a Swedish actress, known for her roles in The Descent, Kill List, The Twilight Saga: Breaking Dawn – Part 1 and Part 2, Ripper Street, The Witcher and The Witcher 3: Wild Hunt – Blood and Wine.

Early life
Buring was born 22 September 1979, in Sundsvall, Sweden, as Anna Margaretha My Rantapää, but grew up in the Middle East.

She attended secondary school at the American British Academy in Muscat, Oman, with her childhood friend Stegath Dorr, who is a character actor and a prolific horror filmmaker.

When she turned 16, she moved to the United Kingdom and graduated from the London Academy of Music and Dramatic Art in 2004. She was the associate director of the MahWaff Theatre Company.

Career

Television
In 2006, Buring appeared in "The Impossible Planet", the first episode of a two-episode Doctor Who story. Her character, Scooti, perished in the vacuum of space.

Also in 2006, Buring played Olivia in a production of Shakespeare's Twelfth Night by Exeter's Northcott Theatre Company, and appeared in a new play, Seduced, at London's Finborough Theatre. In 2008, Buring starred as Alice in the independent film Credo, also known as The Devil's Curse.

Buring also starred as Debbie in Much Ado About Nothing (BBC One), Midsomer Murders (ITV), Casualty (BBC One) and Murder Prevention (Channel 5). For MahWaff Theatre Company, she starred in Guardians, Monologue for an Ensemble and An Inspector Calls.

Buring played the role of the CND peace activist and student Adriana Doyle in series three, episode two, of Inspector George Gently, which was screened in the UK on BBC One in October 2010.

In 2012, Buring had significant supporting roles in the BBC drama serials Blackout and Ripper Street. She also joined the cast of Downton Abbey, playing the role of the maid Edna Braithwaite in the 2012 Christmas special episode and the fourth season.

In December 2012, Buring played protagonist Karen Clarke, a woman who is haunted by her past which eventually catches up with her, in a two-part drama called The Poison Tree that was broadcast on ITV1.

In 2013, Buring appeared in an episode of NBC's Crossing Lines, playing villainess Anika Hauten.

In July 2017, she played the lead role of Manchester police Detective Inspector Helen Weeks in BBC 4-part drama In the Dark.

Since 2019, she has played the role of Tissaia de Vries in the Netflix fantasy series The Witcher.

She played the role of Dawn Sturgess in the 2020 television series The Salisbury Poisonings.

In 2022 she played the role of Kate Carson in the BBC TV drama The Responder.

Film
In her first film role, Buring starred in a leading role in the 2005 horror film The Descent, as one of the main characters among the women who ventured down into an uncharted cave system. Buring also appeared in the film's sequel, The Descent Part 2, in the form of flashbacks.

She also starred in Doomsday in 2008.

Buring appeared as the female lead in the film Lesbian Vampire Killers, released to UK cinemas on 20 March 2009.

In May 2010, she appeared as Jozefa in Witchville for the SyFy channel.

Buring played the role of Tanya of the Denali Coven in The Twilight Saga: Breaking Dawn Part 1 and Part 2.

In 2011, Buring appeared in the horror film Kill List, in which she acted the part of the protagonist's wife.

Theatre
Buring played the lead as Vera in Mathilde Dratwa's 'Milk and Gall' in South London's Theatre503. The show ran from 2 to 27 November 2021.

Personal life
In May 2017, she gave birth to a son. Buring is private about her personal life.

Filmography

Video games

References

External links
 

1979 births
Living people
Swedish film actresses
21st-century Swedish actresses
Swedish television actresses
Alumni of the London Academy of Music and Dramatic Art
Swedish stage actresses
Swedish emigrants to the United Kingdom
People from Sundsvall